Australia is home to four professional football codes. This is a comprehensive list of crowd figures for Australian football codes in 2009. It includes several different competitions and matches from Australian rules football, rugby league, football (soccer) and rugby union (international rules football is a code of football played by Australian rules footballers). Sydney and Brisbane have teams represented in all four codes. Hobart and Darwin are Australia's only capital cities without a professional football team.

Included competitions

National competitions
Several football codes have national (domestic) competitions in Australia, the following are taken into consideration:

The 2009 Australian Football League season (AFL), which includes a finals series and a pre-season cup (the 2009 NAB Cup)
The 2009 National Rugby League season (NRL)
The 2009–10 A-League season (A-L)

Two of these leagues, specifically the NRL and A-League, have one team in New Zealand. Attendance figures for the New Zealand teams are not taken into account in the figures on this page.

Other competitions
Other competitions, such as international and representative competitions, included are:

The 2009 Tri Nations Series (Tri Nat) 
The 2009 Rugby League State of Origin series (SoO)
The 2009 Super 14 season
The 2009 Asian Champions League (ACL)
The 3rd Round of Asian qualification for the 2010 FIFA World Cup (WCQ)

Note: For these competitions, only figures for games that take place in Australia are taken into account

Non-competition games
Some non-competition matches (such as friendly and exhibition matches) are also included:

E. J. Whitten Legends Game
Home test matches played by the Australian National Rugby Union Team, the Wallabies, in 2009.
Home test matches played by the Australian National Rugby League Team, the Kangaroos, in 2009.

Note: this list will be updated as more games are scheduled.

Competitions not included
There are several notable semi-professional regional and state based competitions which draw notable attendances and charge an entry fee that are not listed here.  These are worth mentioning as some of their attendances rival those of national competitions and compete for spectator interest.

These include (ranked by approximate season attendances):

*includes finals

As the attendance figures for some of these competitions can be difficult to obtain (many don't publish season figures and some play matches as curtain raisers to other events), they have not been included in the official lists.

Attendances by Code
In order to directly compare sports, the total attendances for each major code are listed here. The colour-coding of the different codes is used throughout the article.

Note that only the competitions that appear on this page excluding those specifically not included are considered, there are many other (generally smaller) competitions, leagues and matches that take place for all of the football codes, but these are not included. The following are included:

 Rugby union attendances include some games from the Super 14.
 The Rugby league figures include representative matches (State of Origin and International Tests Matches). 
 Association football (soccer) attendances include the World Cup qualifiers played by the Socceroos, as well as Asian Champions League matches

Attendances by League
Some codes have multiple competitions, several competitions are compared here.

Attendances by team
Total home attendances for domestic league competitions are listed here.

Teams are listed by competition – generally the figures only take regular season games into account, however international teams may include all games played (competition games and non-competition games)
The Kangaroos are Australia's national Rugby league team, the Socceroos are Australia's national association football (soccer) team, and the Wallabies are Australia's national rugby union team – their nicknames are used to avoid confusion

Attendances by Match
Attendances for single matches are listed here. Note that not all matches are necessarily included.

Single matches
These are once-off matches, that aren't part of any regular league competition.

Finals

Regular season

See also
2008 Australian football code crowds
Australian rules football attendance records
Sports attendance

External links
 Official Website of the Australian Football League
 National Rugby League
 A-League Official website
 Asian Champions League Official website

Note: Sources for this Article are from Wikipedia related articles regarding the included competitions and teams.

Australian football code crowds
Football code crowds
2009 in Australian rugby league
Australian Football Code Crowds, 2009
Australian football code crowds